Rukiya Bizimana (born 23 March 2006) is a Burundian footballer who plays as a forward for Etoile du matin and Burundi women's national team.

International career 
In February 2022, Bizimana scored four goals in their 11–1 aggregate victory over Djibouti which qualified them to the 2022 African Women Cup of Nations, their first African Women's Cup of Nations tournament.

References

External links 
 

2006 births
Living people
Burundian women's footballers
Women's association football forwards
Burundi women's international footballers